

Drivers
This is a list of racing drivers who have competed in the British Touring Car Championship, sorted alphabetically by surname. Drivers who participated in the 2021 season are highlighted in bold.

A

B

C

D

E

F

G

H

I

J

K

L

M

N

O

P

R

S

T

V

W

Teams

Alfa Romeo

Audi

BMW

Chevrolet

Ford

1991–2000
1991 Ford Sierra Saphire
1993–1995 Ford Mondeo Saloon
1996–2000 Ford Mondeo Hatch
2009 Ford Focus ST
2010 Ford Focus ST LPG
2011 Ford Focus ST
1991 Robb Gravett
1993 Paul Radisich, Andy Rouse
1994 Paul Radisich, Andy Rouse
1995 Paul Radisich, Kelvin Burt
1996 Paul Radisich, Steve Robertson
1997 Paul Radisich, Will Hoy
1998 Will Hoy, Craig Baird, Nigel Mansell
1999 Alain Menu, Anthony Reid
2000 Alain Menu, Anthony Reid, Rickard Rydell
2009 Tom Chilton, Alan Morrison, Tom Onslow-Cole
2010 Tom Chilton, Tom Onslow-Cole
2011 Tom Chilton, Tom Onslow-Cole, Andy Neate

Honda 

1995–2000 Honda Accord
2002–2003 Honda Civic Type R
2010–2011 Honda Civic Type S
2012 Honda Civic
1995 David Leslie, James Kaye
1996 David Leslie, James Kaye
1997 James Thompson, Gabriele Tarquini
1998 James Thompson, Peter Kox
1999 James Thompson, Peter Kox, Gabriele Tarquini
2000 James Thompson, Gabriele Tarquini, Tom Kristensen, David Leslie
2002 Andy Priaulx, Alan Morrison
2003 Matt Neal, Alan Morrison, Tom Chilton
2010 Matt Neal, Gordon Shedden
2011 Matt Neal, Gordon Shedden
2012 Matt Neal, Gordon Shedden
2013 Matt Neal, Gordon Shedden
2014 Matt Neal, Gordon Shedden
2015 Matt Neal, Gordon Shedden

MG

Mitsubishi

1991
Mitsubishi Galant
Mark Hales

Nissan 

1991–1999
Nissan Primera
1991 Kieth Odor, Julian Bailey
1992 Kieth Odor, Andy Middlehurst, James Weaver
1993 Kieth Odor, Win Percy, Tiff Needell
1994 Kieth Odor, Eric Van de Poele, Tiff Needell
1996 Gary Ayles, Owen McAuley
1997 David Leslie, Anthony Reid
1998 David Leslie, Anthony Reid
1999 David Leslie, Laurent Aïello

Peugeot

1992–1995 Peugeot 405 Mi16
1996–1998 Peugeot 406
2001 Peugeot 406 Coupe
1992 Robb Gravett
1993 Robb Gravett, Eugene O’Brien, Ian Flux
1994 Eugene O’Brien, Patrick Watts
1995 Simon Harrison, Patrick Watts
1996 Tim Harvey, Patrick Watts
1997 Tim Harvey, Patrick Watts
1998 Tim Harvey, Paul Radisich
2001 Steve Soper, Dan Eaves, Aaron Slight, Matt Neal

Proton

Renault 

1993–1999
1993 Renault 19 16V Saloon
1994–1999 Renault Laguna
1993 Tim Harvey, Alain Menu
1994 Tim Harvey, Alain Menu
1995 Alain Menu, Will Hoy
1996 Alain Menu, Will Hoy
1997 Alain Menu, Jason Plato
1998 Alain Menu, Jason Plato
1999 Jason Plato, Jean-Christophe Boullion

SEAT 

2004–2008
2004–2005 SEAT Toledo Cupra
2005–2007 SEAT Leon
2008 SEAT Leon TDI
2004 Jason Plato, Robert Huff
2005 Jason Plato, James Pickford, Luke Hines
2006 Jason Plato, James Thompson, Darren Turner
2007 Jason Plato, Darren Turner, Tom Coronel
2008 Jason Plato, Darren Turner

Toyota

1991–1995
1991–1993 Toyota Carina
1994–1995 Toyota Carina E
1991 Andy Rouse, Gary Ayles
1992 Will Hoy, Andy Rouse, Thorkild Thyrring, Julian Bailey
1993 Will Hoy, Julian Bailey
1994 Will Hoy, Julian Bailey, Tim Sugden
1995 Julian Bailey, Tim Sugden
2019 Toyota Corolla GT
2019 Tom Ingram

Vauxhall

1991–2009
1991–1992 Vauxhall Cavalier Gsi
1993–1995 Vauxhall Cavalier 16V
1996–2000 Vauxhall Vectra
2001–2004 Vauxhall Astra Coupe
2005–2006 Vauxhall Astra Sport Hatch
2007–2008 Vauxhall Vectra VXR
1991 John Cleland, Jeff Allam
1992 John Cleland, Jeff Allam
1993 John Cleland, Jeff Allam
1994 John Cleland, Jeff Allam
1995 John Cleland, James Thompson, Jeff Allam, Mikael Briggs
1996 John Cleland, James Thompson
1997 John Cleland, Derek Warwick
1998 John Cleland, Derek Warwick
1999 John Cleland, Yvan Muller
2000 Yvan Muller, Jason Plato, Vincent Radermecker
2001 Yvan Muller, Jason Plato
2002 Yvan Muller, James Thompson
2003 Yvan Muller, James Thompson, Paul O’Neill
2004 Yvan Muller, James Thompson, Luke Hines
2005 Yvan Muller, Colin Turkington, Gavin Smith
2006 Fabrizio Giovanardi, Tom Chilton, Gavin Smith, Erkut Kızılırmak
2007 Fabrizio Giovanardi, Tom Chilton, Alain Menu
2008 Fabrizio Giovanardi, Matt Neal, Tom Onslow-Cole
2009 Fabrizio Giovanardi, Matt Neal, Andrew Jordan
2017– Vauxhall Astra
2017 Tom Chilton, Senna Proctor, Robert Huff
2018 Senna Proctor, Josh Cook

Volvo

Constructor representation

British Touring Car Championship